Francisco Gómez de Llano (1896–1970) was a Spanish politician and diplomat. In Francoist Spain, he served as Minister of Finance (1951–1957) and as Ambassador to the Holy See (1957–1962).

Biography 
Born on 22 October 1896 in Madrid. After earning a Licentiate degree in Law at the University of Madrid, he joined the elite State Lawyers Corps. He served as official during the dictatorship of Primo de Rivera. He was a member of the Asociación Católica Nacional de Propagandistas (A.C.N. de P.).

In Francoist Spain, from July 1951 to February 1957, he served as Minister of Finance, espousing the paradigm of restraint of public spending in order to balance public budget. With a political profile described as one of a "technocrat" and not substantially involved with Falangism, Gómez de Llano sometimes clashed with his Falangist peers at the Council of Ministers. Appointed as Ambassador to the Holy See in 1957, he served in the diplomatic mission in the Vatican until 1962, when he was replaced by José María Doussinague.

He died in Madrid on 31 October 1970.

Decorations 
 Grand Cross of the Order of Isabella the Catholic (1954)
 Grand Cross of the Order of the Agricultural Merit (1955)
 Gold Medal to Merit in the Insurance (1955)
 Grand Cross of the Order of St. Raymond of Peñafort (1957)
 Grand Cross of the Order of Charles III (1957)
 Grand Cross of the Order of Naval Merit (1957)

References 

Government ministers of Spain
Members of the State Lawyers Corps
Economy and finance ministers of Spain
1896 births
1970 deaths